Atopochilus macrocephalus is a species of upside-down catfish endemic to Angola where it occurs in the Kwango River in the vicinity of Fort Don Carlos.  This species grows to a length of  SL. It is consumed for food and is threatened by human activities with very extensive diamond mining being the most significant threat.

References

macrocephalus
Catfish of Africa
Freshwater fish of Angola
Endemic fauna of Angola
Fish described in 1906
Taxa named by George Albert Boulenger